Shape Up and Dance was the umbrella name for a popular series of exercise instruction albums released in the United Kingdom between 1982 and 1984, during the 1980s aerobics craze. The albums were choreographed by Christina Brookes and each one was presented by a different well-known personality from the world of sport or entertainment. The music consisted of anonymous cover versions of hit records. The albums were released on vinyl and cassette. The first two albums in the collection sold well and enjoyed lengthy stays on the UK album charts, but the trend quickly lost impact.

The albums in the series were:
Felicity Kendal
Angela Rippon
Isla St Clair
Suzanne Danielle
Christina Brookes
Lulu
Jay Aston (singer with Bucks Fizz)
Suzanne Dando (athlete)
George Best and Mary Stavin
Patti Boulaye (singer)

References 

Exercise instructors
1980s compilation albums
Compilation album series